Original Gangster 2: Black Area is a 2017 Burmese action film, directed by Joe starring Myint Myat, Yone Lay, Zin Wine, Khin Hlaing, Htoo Char and Yu Thandar Tin. It is the second movie of Original Gangster film series. Original Gangster 1 was only released as Direct-to-video in 2016. But Original Gangster 2 was released as Big screen film and produced by Royal Hero Film Production premiered in Myanmar on July 7, 2017.

Cast
Myint Myat as Nga Htoo
Yone Lay as Nga Ye
Zin Wine as U Mogok
Khin Hlaing as Aung Gyi
Htoo Char as Htoo Char
Yu Thandar Tin as Kay Thi

References

2017 films
2010s Burmese-language films
Burmese action films
Films shot in Myanmar
2017 action films